Göyük or Köyük or Gëyuk or Keyuk may refer to:
Göyük, Aghjabadi, Azerbaijan
Köyük, Yevlakh, Azerbaijan

See also
Givak (disambiguation)